Andrew Brockhurst (born 18 August 1964) is a former Australian rules footballer who played with Fitzroy in the Victorian Australian Football League (VFL/AFL).

Brockhurst, a half back and wingman, was already 23 when he came to Fitzroy, having previously played at South Adelaide. After a third-place finish in South Adelaide's 1986 best and fairest award, he was picked up by Fitzroy with their first selection of the 1987 VFL Draft.

He made 20 disposals on his league debut against the Brisbane Bears and wouldn't better that number in the rest of his 16 games that year.

References

1964 births
Australian rules footballers from South Australia
Fitzroy Football Club players
South Adelaide Football Club players
Living people
Reynella Football Club players